Angel Penna may refer to:

 Angel Penna, Sr. (1923–1992), Argentine-born U.S. Racing Hall of Fame thoroughbred trainer
 Angel Penna, Jr. (b. 1948), Argentine-born U.S. thoroughbred trainer; see Everglades Stakes